Limited Edition(s) may refer to:

Limited edition or special edition, an item or collection produced in limited numbers or for a limited time
Limited Edition (Magic: The Gathering), the first Magic: The Gathering card set, 1993
"Limited Edition" (song) by Sevi, 2011
Limited Edition Sportswear, an Australian clothing company

Albums
Limited Edition (Can album), 1974; expanded as Unlimited Edition, 1976
Limited Edition (Lewis Taylor album), 2002
Limited Edition (Roger McGuinn album), 2004
Limited Edition (Yolandita Monge album), 1991
Limited Edition 2004, by Lewis Taylor, 2004
Limited Editions 1990–94, by Alec Empire, 1994
Limited-Edition Vinyl Box Set, by Metalica, 2004

EPs
Limited Edition (Benjy Davis Project EP), 2007
Limited Edition (The Concretes EP), comprised in Boyoubetterunow, 2000
Limited Edition (Pocket Dwellers EP), 1998
Limited Edition EP, by Psychopathic Rydas, 2004
Limited Edition Live 12-6-2000, by Out of the Grey, 2001
Limited Edition Tour EP, by Caedmon's Call, 1997

he:מהדורה מוגבלת